Huws is a surname. Notable people with the surname include:

Bethan Huws (born 1961), Welsh artist
Emily Huws (born 1942), Welsh writer
Emyr Huws (born 1993), Welsh footballer
Iwan Huws, Welsh politician
Meri Huws, Welsh Language Commissioner

Welsh-language surnames